The 1969 Volta a Catalunya was the 49th edition of the Volta a Catalunya cycle race and was held from 9 September to 16 September 1969. The race started in Figueres and finished in Manresa. The race was won by Mariano Díaz.

General classification

References

1969
Volta
1969 in Spanish road cycling
September 1969 sports events in Europe